Anzac Avenue is a street in Auckland, New Zealand's most populous city. It was constructed between 1914 and 1919 to link Beach Road to Symonds Street, and was named as a memorial to the troops who died in the Gallipoli campaign.

History

Anzac Avenue and neighbouring Beach Road follow the shape of the original shoreline of the Auckland waterfront, leading from Symonds Street towards the Point Britomart headland, passing alongside Official Bay and Mechanics Bay. Land reclamations of the harbour began in the 1860s, changing the landscape. Anzac Avenue was originally the location of Te Hororoa Pā, a name which name refers to an incident where part of the pā site slipped into the ocean. In the 1740s, the Waiōhua settlement at Te Hororoa was one of the final to fall during Waiohua's defeat to Ngāti Whātua.

Anzac Avenue, which started construction in 1914, followed the route of Jermyn Street, but was renamed in 1916 to form a memorial to those who had died at Gallipoli, overriding a recommendation to call it Jellicoe Street. There was an objection to the renaming, because the previous name honoured Captain John Jermyn Symonds, an early resident of the street and figure in the early history of Auckland. A commemoration of the construction of the road was held in 1918, where the Governor-General, Arthur Foljambe, planted two puriri trees at the corner of Anzac Avenue and Waterloo Quadrant, and a score of trees were planted by others. The road was described as busy in 1919 even before it was fully completed. A tramline along Anzac Avenue was opened in February 1921.

Demographics

Anzac Avenue had a population of 2,748 at the 2018 New Zealand census, an increase of 180 people (7.0%) since the 2013 census, and an increase of 624 people (29.4%) since the 2006 census. There were 1,458 households, comprising 1,422 males and 1,323 females, giving a sex ratio of 1.07 males per female. The median age was 30.6 years (compared with 37.4 years nationally), with 90 people (3.3%) aged under 15 years, 1,215 (44.2%) aged 15 to 29, 1,269 (46.2%) aged 30 to 64, and 168 (6.1%) aged 65 or older.

Ethnicities were 45.9% European/Pākehā, 4.4% Māori, 2.6% Pacific peoples, 44.4% Asian, and 8.8% other ethnicities. People may identify with more than one ethnicity.

The percentage of people born overseas was 66.5, compared with 27.1% nationally.

Although some people chose not to answer the census's question about religious affiliation, 54.9% had no religion, 24.7% were Christian, 0.2% had Māori religious beliefs, 5.1% were Hindu, 3.2% were Muslim, 3.8% were Buddhist and 3.8% had other religions.

Of those at least 15 years old, 1,320 (49.7%) people had a bachelor's or higher degree, and 90 (3.4%) people had no formal qualifications. The median income was $37,200, compared with $31,800 nationally. 600 people (22.6%) earned over $70,000 compared to 17.2% nationally. The employment status of those at least 15 was that 1,527 (57.4%) people were employed full-time, 363 (13.7%) were part-time, and 135 (5.1%) were unemployed.

Notable locations

Brooklyn Flats, 66–70 Emily Place, 1936, apartment block.
Eden Hall, 3 Eden Crescent, 1936, apartment block.
Logan Bank, 114 Anzac Avenue, 1917, remnants of a house built 1871 and occupied by John Logan Campbell, used as support for the construction of Anzac Avenue.
Station Hotel, 122 Anzac Avenue, 1931, hotel fronting on both Beach Road and Anzac Avenue.
Berrisville Flats, 152 Anzac Avenue, 1937, apartment block.
High Court Building, corner Anzac Avenue and Waterloo Crescent, 1868, originally the Supreme Court building, built in Gothic Revival style.
Braemar, 7 Parliament Street, 1901, apartment complex.
Middle Courtville, 9 Parliament Street, 1914, apartment complex.
Corner Courtville, 11 Parliament Street, 1919, apartment complex.

References

Streets in Auckland
ANZAC (New Zealand)
Auckland CBD